Events from the year 1445 in France

Incumbents
 Monarch – Charles VII

Events
 16 August - Margaret Stewart, Dauphine of France, the Scottish Princess and wife of the future Louis XI dies
 20 October - Richard, Duke of York returns to England after five years as the English commander in France during the Hundred Years War

Births
 Unknown - Guillaume Briçonnet, cardinal (died 1514)

Deaths
 16 August - Margaret Stewart, Dauphine of France (born 1424)

References

1440s in France